Some Liar is a 1919 American silent Western comedy film directed by Henry King and starring William Russell, Eileen Percy, and Heywood Mack.

Cast
 William Russell as Robert Winchester McTabb 
 Eileen Percy as Celie Sterling 
 Heywood Mack as Sheldon Lewis Kellard 
 J. Gordon Russell as High Spade McQueen 
 John Gough as Loco Ike / Octogenarian suitor

References

Bibliography
 Donald W. McCaffrey & Christopher P. Jacobs. Guide to the Silent Years of American Cinema. Greenwood Publishing, 1999.

External links
 

1919 films
1910s Western (genre) comedy films
1919 comedy films
American black-and-white films
1910s English-language films
Films based on works by James Oliver Curwood
Films directed by Henry King
Pathé Exchange films
Silent American Western (genre) comedy films
1910s American films